A stationary front (or quasi-stationary front) is a weather front or transition zone between two air masses when both air mass is advancing into the other at speeds exceeding 5 knots (about 6 miles per hour or about 9 kilometers per hour) at the ground surface. On weather maps, it's illustrated as a solid line of alternating blue spikes pointing to the warmer air mass and red domes facing the colder air mass.

Development
A stationary front may form when a cold or warm front slows down or grows over time from underlying surface temperature differences, like a coastal front. Winds on the cold air and warm air sides often flow nearly parallel to the stationary front, often in opposite directions along either side of the stationary front. A stationary front usually remains in the same area for hours to days and may undulate as atmospheric waves move eastward along the front.

Stationary fronts may also change into a cold or warm front and may form one or more extratropical or mid-latitude cyclones at the surface when atmospheric waves aloft are fiercer, cold or warm air masses advance fast enough into other air masses at the surface.  For instance, when a cold air mass traverses sufficiently quick into a warm air mass, the stationary front changes into a cold front.

Characteristics 
Although the stationary front's position may not move, there is air motion as warm air rises up and over the cold air, responsive to the geostrophic induced by frontogenesis. A wide variety of weather may occur along a stationary front. If one or both air masses are humid enough, cloudy skies and prolonged precipitation are recurring, with storm trains or mesocyclone systems. When the warmer air mass is very moist, heavy or extreme rain or snow can occur.

Stationary fronts may dissipate after several days or devolve into shear lines. A stationary front becomes a shear line when air density contrast across the front vanishes, usually because of temperature equalization, while the narrow wind shift zone persists for some time. That is most common over open oceans, where the ocean surface temperature is similar on both sides of the front and modifies both air masses to correspond to its temperature. That sometimes also provides enough heat energy and moisture to form subtropical storms and tropical cyclones at the surface.

References

External links
Quasi-Stationary Front (also known as Stationary Front).
Stationary Front.
Categories: 
 Synoptic meteorology and weather
 Weather fronts

Synoptic meteorology and weather
Weather fronts